The 7th FINA Synchronized Swimming World Cup was held August 1–5, 1995 in Atlanta, USA. It featured swimmers from 9 nations, swimming in three events: Solo, Duet and Team.

Participating nations
9 nations swam at the 1995 Synchro World Cup:

Results

Point standings

References

FINA Synchronized Swimming World Cup
1995 in synchronized swimming
International aquatics competitions hosted by the United States
1995 in American sports
Sports competitions in Georgia (U.S. state)
1995 in sports in Georgia (U.S. state)
Synchronized swimming competitions in the United States